1276 Ucclia is a carbonaceous Alauda asteroid from the outer region of the asteroid belt, approximately  in diameter. It was discovered on 24 January 1933 by Belgian astronomer Eugène Delporte at the Royal Observatory of Belgium in Uccle. Two nights later, the body was independently discovered by Richard Schorr at Bergedorf Observatory in Hamburg, Germany. It was named for the Belgium city of Uccle and its discovering observatory.

Orbit and classification 

Ucclia is a member of the Alauda family, a large family of typically bright carbonaceous asteroids and named after its parent body, 702 Alauda. It orbits the Sun in the outer main-belt at a distance of 2.9–3.5 AU once every 5 years and 8 months (2,069 days). Its orbit has an eccentricity of 0.09 and an inclination of 23° with respect to the ecliptic. No precoveries were taken prior to its discovery.

Naming 

This minor planet was named after Uccle, in honor of both, the city and the discovering observatory.

Physical characteristics

Rotation period 

A rotational lightcurve of Ucclia was obtained from photometric observations by Italian and French astronomers Silvano Casulli, Federico Manzini and Pierre Antonini in March 2007. It showed a well-defined rotation period of  hours with a brightness variation of 0.40 in magnitude. In June 2008, a second light-curve by Slovak astronomer Adrián Galád at Modra Observatory, gave a concurring period of  hours with an amplitude of 0.29 in magnitude.

Diameter and albedo 

According to the surveys carried out by the Infrared Astronomical Satellite IRAS, the Japanese Akari satellite, and NASA's Wide-field Infrared Survey Explorer with its subsequent NEOWISE mission, Ucclia measures between 30.1 and 40.0 kilometers in diameter and its surface has an albedo between 0.05 and 0.14. The Collaborative Asteroid Lightcurve Link derives an albedo of 0.08 and a diameter of 30.3 kilometers.

References

External links 
 Lightcurve Database Query (LCDB), at www.minorplanet.info
 Dictionary of Minor Planet Names, Google books
 Asteroids and comets rotation curves, CdR – Geneva Observatory, Raoul Behrend
 Discovery Circumstances: Numbered Minor Planets (1)-(5000) – Minor Planet Center
 
 

001276
Discoveries by Eugène Joseph Delporte
Named minor planets
19330124